Mimonephelotes enganensis is a species of beetle in the family Cerambycidae, and the only species in the genus Mimonephelotes. It was described by Breuning in 1970. Breuning mistakenly thought the name was a junior homonym of the genus Mimonephelotus and proposed a replacement name, Mimanhammus in 1971, but under the ICZN the two names are not homonyms, so the original genus name is valid.

References

Lamiini
Beetles described in 1970